TD Place Arena, originally the Ottawa Civic Centre, is an indoor arena located in Ottawa, Ontario, Canada, seating 5,500. With temporary seating and standing room it can hold 10,585. Opened in December 1967, it is used primarily for sports, including curling, figure skating, ice hockey and lacrosse. The arena has hosted Canadian and world championships in figure skating and ice hockey, including the first women's world ice hockey championship in 1990. Canadian championships in curling have also been hosted at the arena. It is also used for concerts and conventions such as Ottawa SuperEX.

The arena is the home of the Ottawa 67's of the Ontario Hockey League (OHL). It was the former home of the Ottawa Senators of the National Hockey League (NHL) from 1992 through 1995, the Ottawa Nationals of the World Hockey Association (WHA) from 1972 to 1973 and the Ottawa Civics of the WHA in 1976, and the Ottawa Rebel of the National Lacrosse League from 2002 to 2003.

Canadian Prime Ministers Pierre Trudeau, John Turner, Brian Mulroney and Kim Campbell were elected party leaders here.

History
In the 1960s, the City of Ottawa was preparing to rebuild the football stadium at Lansdowne Park, on Bank Street at the Rideau Canal.  During the planning phase, the old Ottawa Auditorium arena was demolished and the City now needed two new sports venues. The City combined plans and the arena, named the Civic Centre, was built together under the north grandstand of the football stadium. One side of the arena is located beneath the upper part of the stadium grandstand, with a much lower ceiling than the opposite side of the arena.

Dominion Bridge was the supplier of the huge steel girders for the arena and stadium's frame, some so large they had to be brought to the site by barge, up the Ottawa River and down the Rideau Canal. According to Dominion Bridge "the most striking feature of the unique design concept is a giant overhanging roof reaching out 170 degrees from atop eight massive steel A-frames."

The new Civic Centre opened on December 29, 1967, although seating was not complete, for an exhibition game between the Ottawa 67's, boosted by five players from the Montreal Junior Canadiens, and the NHL Montreal Canadiens. Seats were taken temporarily from the Coliseum building nearby. Then President Howard Darwin said about 500 fans had to be turned away at the door. Of the 9,000 who attended the opening game, only six ticket-holders requested and received refunds. The football stadium and arena complex was Ottawa's official "Centennial Project." Federal government grant money depended on the facility opening in 1967, and construction was rushed to meet the deadline.

It was renovated and seating increased in 1992 in order to temporarily accommodate the Ottawa Senators of the NHL. Luxury boxes were hung from the ceiling over ¾ of the bowl and all seats except for the club seats were narrowed slightly in order to increase capacity to over 10,000. The seats were replaced in 2005 and wider seats were installed, thus reducing capacity to under 10,000 again.

As part of the Lansdowne Park redevelopment, the arena underwent renovations, which included new seats (up to 9,500 capacity) digital signage, and ceiling tiles to cover the steel support beams, in which the fire retardant was removed. The scoreboard over the ice was removed, and a new scoreboard was installed on the north wall.

The renovation also sealed up constant leaks that had been a problem for the Civic Centre for years. During the 2011–12 season, a 67's game had to be rescheduled because of the leaking roof. Midway through the renovation process at the end of 2013, steel corrosion was discovered by workers and cost an extra $17 million to repair. While the arena was renovated, the 67's used the Canadian Tire Centre for the 2012–13 and 2013-14 seasons.

Sports

Ice hockey

The primary tenant since the building's opening has been the Ottawa 67's junior men's team. The arena's seating capacity is large by junior standards. The team played before large crowds in the 1960s and 1970s but attendance started to drop in the late 80s and bottomed out after the arrival of the Ottawa Senators in the early 1990s. In 1998 the team was bought by local businessman Jeff Hunt and he successfully improved attendance to take advantage of the arena's large capacity. Since then, the 67's have been one of the top-10 junior teams in Canada in terms of attendance, often finishing #1 on the list. The club has also been successful on the ice, winning the OHL Championship in 1977, 1984, and 2001 and the Memorial Cup championship in 1984 and 1999. The 1972 and 1999 Memorial Cup tournaments were played at the arena, and the 1999 tournament was won by the host 67's.

In the 1970s, the arena was home to two WHA professional teams, the Ottawa Nationals and Ottawa Civics. Neither survived in Ottawa for more than one season. The Nationals played for one regular season, but moved their playoff games to Toronto, and subsequently moved there permanently to become the Toronto Toros. The Civics were the hastily transplanted Denver Spurs franchise that played only two home games in Ottawa before disbanding.

The arena hosted the first-ever Canada Cup hockey game on September 2, 1976, when Canada crushed Finland 11-2. They also hosted games in the 1981 Canada Cup.

The arena was the site of the first IIHF Women's World Ice Hockey Championships in 1990. Canada defeated the United States 5–2 on March 25, 1990 to win the gold medal.

Starting in 1992, the new National Hockey League Ottawa Senators called the arena home for three and a half seasons. In preparation for the NHL, it was refurbished for the Senators, adding additional seating and 32 private boxes.

In 1995, Roller Hockey International's Ottawa Loggers (renamed the "Ottawa Wheels" prior to their move to the Corel Centre) brought inline hockey to the arena, though the inline version of the sport proved to be both unprofitable and unpopular in Ottawa.

In 2008 and 2009, it was used for games of the 2009 World Junior Ice Hockey Championships.

Figure skating
The arena's unique arrangement of having most of the seats on one side of the ice has been described by Barbara Underhill as making it an ideal venue for figure skating presentations. The arena has hosted the 1978 and 1984 World Figure Skating Championships and the 2003 World Synchronized Skating Championships. The arena has hosted the Canadian Figure Skating Championships in 1987, 1996, 1999, 2006 and 2017.

Both Worlds provided memorable moments in sports. In 1978 Vern Taylor performed the first 'Triple Axel' jump in competition. In 1984, the Canadian pairs champions Barbara Underhill and Paul Martini won the Championship in dramatic fashion:

"After a disappointing Olympics in Sarajevo, Barbara and Paul seriously contemplated retiring from skating before Worlds'. However, advised by their friend Brian Orser to put on her old skate boots, Barbara and Paul were propelled onto the ice, onto the podium and into history. Their flawless program is considered one of the great Canadian sporting moments and gave Canada a national thrill."

Other sports 
The arena has played host to several national curling championships; and will host the 2023 World Men's Curling Championship. In men's play, the arena played host to the 1979, 1993, 2001, and 2016 Brier Canadian men's championships. It has also played host to the 1990 Scott Tournament of Hearts Canadian women's championships.

The arena was the home of the Ottawa Rebel of the National Lacrosse League for one and a half seasons.

The World Wrestling Federation used the arena jointly with the Robert Guertin Centre in Gatineau for its shows in Ottawa until The Palladium (Canadian Tire Centre) was built in 1996. From 1992 to 1994, the arena would host the November event on the last Friday of the month, with the March and June events being held at Robert Guertin Arena. It still uses the arena from time to time for house shows.

In June 2016, the arena held a MMA event, hosting UFC Fight Night: MacDonald vs. Thompson. This marked the first time a UFC event was held in Ottawa.

Non-sports usage
In April 1968, the arena hosted the Liberal Party of Canada leadership convention, when Pierre Trudeau was named Canadian Prime Minister. It also hosted the 1984 Liberal Party leadership convention. The arena also hosted the Progressive Conservative leadership conventions in 1983 and 1993.

Until the mid-2000s, the Central Canada Exhibition, or Ottawa SuperEx, used the arena for concerts and exhibits.

Gallery

See also

 TD Place Stadium
 Ice hockey in Ottawa
 Lansdowne Park
 List of indoor arenas in Canada

References

External links

 Ottawa Civic Centre – OHL Arena & Travel Guide
 Ottawa Civic Centre – Ballparks.com
 City of Ottawa Lansdowne Park website

Ontario Hockey League arenas
Indoor ice hockey venues in Ontario
Indoor lacrosse venues in Canada
Sports venues in Ottawa
Music venues in Ottawa
Defunct National Hockey League venues
World Hockey Association venues
Raymond Moriyama buildings
Ottawa Wheels
Sports venues completed in 1967
Basketball venues in Ontario
1967 establishments in Ontario
Toronto-Dominion Bank
Ottawa Senators